Tyson George Billings (born 1977 or 1978), also known as Freedom George, was a key figure in the Canada convoy protest.

Billings was arrested in February 2022 and pled guilty to one charge of counselling mischief in June 2022.

Activism 
Billings protested the COVID-19 public health measures at the Canada convoy protest along with protest coleader and friend Pat King. He broadcast the protest via his Facebook page. During the protest, Billings boasted that he bypassed police checkpoints.

Criminal charges 
Billings was arrested on 19 February 2022, and along with Pat King, and was he charged with two counts of intimidation and obstructing police, and one count of mischief, counselling intimidation, counselling to commit mischief, counselling to obstruct police, disobeying a court order, and counselling to disobey a court order. After his arrest Billings sold merchandise via his social media accounts.

After 116 days in jail, Billings pled guilty to one charge of counselling mischief and sentences to six months on probation in June 2022.

Career and personal life 
Billings lives in High Prairie, Alberta. After his release from custody, his lawyer stated that he would work on his family's farm.

He was aged 44 years old in 2022.

References 

Living people
1970s births
Canadian anti-vaccination activists
People from Big Lakes County
Protesters involved in the Canada convoy protest